Busia town may refer to:

 Busia, Uganda, a town in Uganda at the border with Kenya
 Busia, Kenya, a town in Kenya at the border with Uganda